Bank of Springfield Center (originally Prairie Capital Convention Center) is a 7,700-seat multi-purpose arena located in Springfield, Illinois.

The facility is adaptable to host a variety of events, including large concerts, theatrical performances, trade shows, sporting events,  and school graduation ceremonies, as well as smaller gatherings such as professional training meetings, weddings and banquets.

It connects, via a tunnel, to the President Abraham Lincoln Hotel.

History
It was built in 1978 and is operated by the Springfield Metropolitan Exposition and Auditorium Authority (SMEAA).

The arena hosts local concerts and sporting events for the area, and is the former home of the Illinois Express of the World Basketball League and the Springfield Stallions indoor football team.

Prairie Capital Convention Center underwent a renovation between 2011–2014 to modernize its facilities and expand the types of events it can accommodate.

In November 2015, the arena hosted Illinois Fighting Illini men's basketball for five games while renovations to the State Farm Center were completed. College wrestling tournaments have also been held at the convention center.

On June 5, 2017, the SMEAA announced that it approved an agreement to sell the naming rights for the facility to the Bank of Springfield for ten years.

In January 2021, the Illinois House of Representatives convened in the arena rather than the State Capitol in order to maintain social distancing during the COVID-19 pandemic.

See also
 List of convention centers in the United States

References

External links
Official Site

Basketball venues in Illinois
Buildings and structures in Springfield, Illinois
College basketball venues in the United States
Convention centers in Illinois
Illinois Fighting Illini men's basketball
Indoor arenas in Illinois
Sports venues in Springfield, Illinois
Tourist attractions in Springfield, Illinois
Wrestling venues in Illinois
Event venues established in 1978
Sports venues completed in 1978
1978 establishments in Illinois